"Shannon" is a 1976 song by Henry Gross.  It became an international hit, reaching #6 and achieving gold record status in the U.S. Billboard Hot 100 and #5 on the Cash Box Top 100. The song reached #1 in Canada and New Zealand.

"Shannon" was written about the death of Beach Boys member Carl Wilson's Irish Setter of the same name. While touring with the Beach Boys in 1975, Gross visited Wilson's home in Los Angeles and in conversation said he had an Irish Setter named Shannon. Wilson replied that he had also had an Irish Setter named Shannon that had recently been killed when hit by a car.

The single went gold in the U.S. and became a worldwide hit, reaching #6 on the U.S. Billboard Hot 100 and #5 on the Cash Box Top 100 in 1976. In Canada it reached #1. "Shannon" also reached #1 in New Zealand, but peaked only at #32 in the UK.

Television performance
On July 23, 1976, Gross performed "Shannon" on the NBC-TV program The Midnight Special.

The Casey Kasem incident
"Shannon" is remembered for being the subject of a profanity-laced tirade by American Top 40 host Casey Kasem, while recording the September 14, 1985 show.  A listener from Cincinnati, Ohio had requested "Shannon" as a "Long-Distance Dedication" (a regular feature of the show) to his own recently deceased dog, named Snuggles.  Kasem was upset that the show's producers had placed the dedication immediately following the Pointer Sisters' hit "Dare Me", an uptempo song that he considered a poor lead-in to a sad song such as "Shannon".  This did not originally air in the broadcast.  The outtakes were distributed years later and wound up on Negativland's U2.

The audio was occasionally played on The Howard Stern Show, The Don and Mike Show and The Neil Rogers Show.  The September 14, 1985 episode, as originally aired, has been rebroadcast in recent years as part of Premiere Radio Networks' American Top 40: The '80s series.

Musicians
 Henry Gross: vocals, electric guitar, acoustic guitar, background vocals
 Allan Schwartzberg: drums
 George Devens: percussion
 Warren Nichols: bass
 Philip Aaberg: piano, electric piano
 Mike Corbett, Marty Nelson, Tommy West: background vocals

Chart performance

Weekly charts

Year-end charts

See also
 List of 1970s one-hit wonders in the United States

References

External links
 

1976 songs
1976 singles
Lifesong Records singles
Songs about dogs
Songs written by Henry Gross
RPM Top Singles number-one singles
Number-one singles in New Zealand